Romanian Folk Dances,, Sz. 56, BB 68 is a suite of six short piano pieces composed by Béla Bartók in 1915. He later orchestrated it for small ensemble in 1917 as Sz. 68, BB 76.

It is based on seven Romanian tunes from Transylvania, originally played on fiddle or shepherd's flute. Its title was originally Romanian Folk Dances from Hungary but was later changed by Bartók when Transylvania became part of Romania in 1920. It is nowadays available in the 1971 edition which is written with key signatures although Bartók rarely used key signatures.

Structure 

This set of dances consists of six movements and, according to the composer, it should take four minutes and three seconds to perform, but most professional pianists take up to five minutes. The list of the movements is as follows (with the original Hungarian title listed first, the most commonly known Romanian title second, and the English translation in parentheses):

Analysis

Arrangements 
Aside from the version Bartók wrote for a small orchestral ensemble, some of Bartók's friends wrote adaptations or transcriptions of this piece for several different ensembles. The following are the best-known:

 Arthur Willner's version for string orchestra. It is a mere transcription with no modification of the original music.
 Zoltán Székely's version for violin and piano. This is not just a transcription, but also an arrangement and adaptation of the piece for these two instruments. Some of the modifications Székely made included transposing some of the movements (the second movement was transposed from D minor to F minor, the third from B minor to D minor and the fourth from A major to C major), repeating some sections, adding bars, and using several techniques for the violin such as artificial harmonics, double stops, and Sautillé.

Notable recordings 

Notable recordings of this composition include the following:

Notable recordings of the arrangement by Zoltán Székely include the following:

See also 
Two Romanian Folk Dances
Culture of Romania
Béla Bartók
List of compositions by Béla Bartók
Transylvania

References

Further reading

External links 

 
 

Compositions by Béla Bartók
Compositions for solo piano
1915 compositions
1917 compositions